Belshazzar was a Babylonian leader.

Belshazzar may also refer to:

 Belshazzar (Handel), Handel's oratorio
 Belshazzar (novel), novel by H. Rider Haggard
 Belshazzar (unit), bottle size
 Belshazzar, a nickname and a trade name for an overhead projector

See also
 Balthazar (disambiguation)
 Belshazzar's Feast (disambiguation)
 Belteshazzar, according to the Book of Daniel, was the Babylonian name given to the prophet Daniel
 Cultural depictions of Belshazzar
 Baghdasar - Armenian form of this name